Ira Wells Wood (June 19, 1856 in Wilkes-Barre, Pennsylvania – October 5, 1931 in Trenton, New Jersey) was an American Republican Party politician who represented  from 1904 to 1913.

Walsh was born in Wilkes-Barre, Pennsylvania on June 19, 1856. He graduated from Princeton College in 1877. He studied law; was admitted to the bar in 1880 and commenced practice in Trenton, New Jersey. In Trenton, he was a member of the city board of education from 1894 to 1896, served in the city council from 1896 to 1900, and was president of the Board of Trade of Trenton from 1896 to 1900. He was a member of the New Jersey General Assembly in 1899 and 1900. He was commissioner for New Jersey to the Louisiana Purchase Exposition held in St. Louis, Missouri in 1904, and was a delegate to the Interparliamentary Peace Union in Brussels, Belgium, in 1905.

Wood was elected as a Republican to the Fifty-eighth Congress to fill the vacancy caused by the resignation of William M. Lanning. He was reelected to the Fifty-ninth and to the three succeeding Congresses and served from November 8, 1904, to March 3, 1913, but declined to be a candidate for reelection to the Sixty-third Congress.

After leaving Congress, he resided in Trenton until his death there on October 5, 1931. He was interred in Trenton's Mercer Cemetery.

External links

Ira Wells Wood at The Political Graveyard

1856 births
1931 deaths
Republican Party members of the New Jersey General Assembly
New Jersey lawyers
Politicians from Trenton, New Jersey
Politicians from Wilkes-Barre, Pennsylvania
Princeton University alumni
Burials in New Jersey
Republican Party members of the United States House of Representatives from New Jersey